Chanapatana International Design Institute (CIDI Chanapatana; Thai: สถาบันออกแบบนานาชาติชนาพัฒน์) is one of the first international schools of design in Thailand. It was founded in 2000 by Somdet Phra Yanawachirodom in co-operation with the leading design school in Florence, Italy. Operating under Luang Phor Viriyang Sirintharo Foundation, the school offers the following international diploma programs:
 Interior & Product design
 Fashion design

References

Further reading

External links 
 
 Aerial photo

Design schools
Institutes of higher education in Thailand
Education in Bangkok
Educational institutions established in 2000
2000 establishments in Thailand